National Security Division, or Bahagian Keselamatan Negara (BKN), is a senior grouping within the Malaysian government which meets infrequently. According to a United States Embassy telegram leaked by WikiLeaks in 2011, BKN is regarded as Malaysia's equivalent to other national security councils. As of November 2006, it was headed by Director General Ahmad Fuad bin Abdul Aziz, who also served as the Secretary of the National Security Council of Malaysia. Its main role is to coordinate a broad range of national security issues including natural disaster management, maritime and border control, and cyber security across other government agencies including the Public Order & Security Division, Defence Staff Intelligence Division, and the Malaysian Special Branch.

Further reading

Notes and references

Malaysia
Federal ministries, departments and agencies of Malaysia
Prime Minister's Department (Malaysia)